Jomana Elmaghrabi (born 21 June 1995) is an Egyptian synchronised swimmer. She competed in the team event at the 2016 Summer Olympics.

References

1995 births
Living people
Egyptian synchronized swimmers
Olympic synchronized swimmers of Egypt
Synchronized swimmers at the 2016 Summer Olympics
Place of birth missing (living people)